George Carter Glass Jr. (March 29, 1893 – December 1, 1955), was a Virginia publisher and politician. He represented Lynchburg and Campbell County in the Virginia Senate for one term.

Early and family life
Carter Glass Jr. was born to newspaper publisher Carter Glass and his wife Aurelia (Ria) Caldwell McDearmon Glass (1859-1937) on March 29, 1893. His father became a Virginia state senator in 1898, and later a U.S. Congressman and U.S. Senator. One of two brothers, Carter Glass Jr. attended Washington and Lee University, from which he received an A.B. degree, and then Virginia Polytechnic University. He was commissioned a second lieutenant of infantry in World War I and reported to Fort Myer, Virginia on June 5, 1917.

He married Maria Binford Thomas (1896-1979), and they had three children: sons Carter Glass III (b. 1919) and Thomas R. Glass (b. 1929), and daughter Aurelia Glass (b. 1935).

Career

He and his brother Powell Glass succeeded their father as publishers of two Lynchburg newspapers, The News (a morning paper) and The Daily Advance (an afternoon paper). Carter Glass, Jr. would in turn be succeeded by his son Thomas R. Glass.

Several years before his father's death, Carter Glass Jr. briefly entered politics, serving in the Virginia Senate (a part-time position) for two years during World War II. His successor Mosby Perrow Jr. would represent Lynchburg for more than two decades, including through the Massive Resistance crisis.

Death
On December 1, 1955, Glass suffered a stroke and died shortly thereafter. He was buried in Lynchburg's Spring Hill Cemetery.

His son Thomas R. Glass continued publishing The News and The Daily Advance until 1979, when he sold them to Worrell Newspapers Inc. Worrell consolidated the papers into a single daily morning paper in 1986; this paper is now known as The News & Advance. Eventually Worrell sold it to Media General. In 2012 Media General sold its newspaper division to Berkshire Hathaway, which continues to publish The News & Advance.

References

1893 births
1955 deaths
Washington and Lee University alumni
Democratic Party Virginia state senators
Politicians from Lynchburg, Virginia
20th-century American politicians